The Cameron Highlands bent-toed gecko (Cyrtodactylus trilatofasciatus) is a species of gecko that is endemic to the Cameron Highlands in Malaysia.

References 

Cyrtodactylus
Reptiles described in 2012